Minuscule 198 (in the Gregory-Aland numbering), ε 311 (Soden), is a Greek minuscule manuscript of the New Testament, on cotton paper. Palaeographically it has been assigned to the 13th century. It has full marginalia.

Description 

The codex contains a complete text of the four Gospels on 171 cotton paper leaves (size ). The text is written in one column per page, in 29 lines per page (size of text 17 by 10.2 cm). The first leaf was supplied by later hand (paper). The paper is brown, ink is brown.

There is also a division according to the Ammonian Sections (in Mark 241 Sections – 16:20), with references to the Eusebian Canons (after Mark ιδ in the same line as Ammonian Sections – see codex 112).

Text 

The Greek text of the codex is a representative of the Byzantine text-type. Aland placed it in Category V.

History 

Formerly the manuscript belonged to the Aedilium Florenz Ecclaesium.

It was examined by Bandini, Birch, Scholz, and Burgon. C. R. Gregory saw it in 1886.

It is currently housed at the Laurentian Library (Aedilium 221), at Florence.

See also 

 List of New Testament minuscules
 Biblical manuscript
 Textual criticism

Notes

References

Further reading 

 Angelo Bandini, Bibliotheca Leopoldin, vol. 1 (Florence 1791), p. 534.

Greek New Testament minuscules
13th-century biblical manuscripts